Marjorie Wintermute (1919–2007) was an American architect in Oregon.  She was educated at the University of Oregon as an interior designer, graduating with a Bachelor of Arts in 1941.  Following her graduation, she worked at the Bonneville Power Administration and then for Standard Oil in San Francisco as a drafter, after which she returned to Oregon to work for Pietro Belluschi's office in Portland. She received her architect's license in 1945.

Career
Wintermute left Belluschi's office upon her marriage in 1947, and continued to work on residential projects from her home while raising her two children. In 1970 she became a principal at Architects Northwest.  Over the next 15 years she held a variety of positions including architect-in-residence for the Washington County Education Service District, architect-in-residence for the Department of Defense Schools in Asia, and coordinator for the Oregon Arts Commission.

Awards
Marjorie Wintermute received several awards in her lifetime for her contribution to education and the profession, including the Gold Medal from the Heart Association, a Gulick Award, a Portland Historic Landmarks Commission Award, and the Oregon Governor's Award for the Arts. She was named a Fellow of the American Institute of Architects.

Books
 Students, Structures and Space (1978)
 Blueprints – A Built Environmental Education Program (1983)
 Architecture as a Basic Curriculum Builder (1991)

References

1919 births
2007 deaths
20th-century American architects
Architects from Portland, Oregon
Fellows of the American Institute of Architects
American women architects
20th-century American women
University of Oregon alumni
21st-century American women